John Henry Prince (born November 15, 1914) is an American former Negro league third baseman who played in the 1930s.

A native of Lumberton, Mississippi, Prince played for the Chicago American Giants in 1936. In nine recorded games, he posted five hits in 28 plate appearances.

References

External links
Baseball statistics and player information from Baseball-Reference Black Baseball Stats and Seamheads

1914 births
Possibly living people
Chicago American Giants players
Baseball third basemen
Baseball players from Mississippi
People from Lumberton, Mississippi